Sar Choqa-ye Sofla (also Romanized as Sar Choqā-ye Soflá; also known as Qerekhlū, Sar Chaqā, Sar Cheqā Pā’īn, and Sarchoghā Pā’īn) is a village in Vardasht Rural District, in the Central District of Semirom County, Isfahan Province, Iran. At the 2006 census, its population was 147, in 30 families.

References 

Populated places in Semirom County